Serdika or Serdica is the historical Roman name of Sofia, now the capital of Bulgaria.

Currently, Serdika is the name of a district located in the city. It includes four neighbourhoods: "Fondovi zhilishta"; "Banishora", "Orlandovtsi" and "Malashevtsi" as well as the central parts of "Draz mahala". It has an area of 17.53 km² that counts for 1.3% of the total Capital Municipality area and 8.8% of the city proper.  Serdica has a population of 52,918.

There are 6 kindergartens, 13 schools and 6 chitalishta in the territory of the district. Healthcare infrastructure includes II and V City Hospitals; Institute of Transport Medicine and two polyclinics. The Sofia Central Railway Station; Central Bus Station Sofia and the Lavov Most are also located in Serdica.

See also
Edict of Serdica (AD 311), through which Emperor Galerius decreed a policy of tolerance towards Christianity
History of Sofia

References

Districts of Sofia